The Vinton Street Commercial Historic District is located along Vinton Street between Elm Street on the west and South 17th Street on the east in south Omaha, Nebraska. This district is located adjacent to Sheelytown, a residential neighborhood that had historically significant populations of Irish, Poles, and Eastern European immigrants.  It grew along with the success of the Union Stockyards and South Omaha. It was added to the National Register of Historic Places in 2006.

See also
 History of Omaha
 Elsasser Bakery
 Arthur G. Rocheford Building

References

History of South Omaha, Nebraska
National Register of Historic Places in Omaha, Nebraska
Historic districts in Omaha, Nebraska
German-American culture in Omaha, Nebraska
Irish-American culture in Omaha, Nebraska
Commercial buildings on the National Register of Historic Places in Nebraska
Historic districts on the National Register of Historic Places in Nebraska
2006 establishments in Nebraska